An n-gram is a sequence of n words, characters, or other linguistic items.

n-gram may also refer to:

 Google Ngram Viewer
 n-gram language model 
 k-mer, the application of the n-gram concept to biological sequences

See also
 Polygram (geometry), polygons ending in the suffix -gram
 Engram (disambiguation)